Blastobasis spermologa is a moth in the  family Blastobasidae. It is found in Sri Lanka and Taiwan.

The larvae feed within the seeds of Camellia sinensis.

References

Moths described in 1916
Blastobasis